Black River-Matheson is a township in the Cochrane District of the Canadian province of Ontario. The municipality is astride the Black River, for which it is partly named. The Matheson railway station was serviced by the Northlander until 2012. Ontario Northland Railway services will be reinstated in 2026.

Matheson was first known as McDougall's Chute after an early trapper.  Renamed for Arthur J. Matheson (1842-1913), provincial Treasurer and M.P.P. for South Lanark.  Became part of Timmins on January 1, 1973.

Mining, forestry and farming are some of the principal industries in the area, augmented by outdoor tourism in the summer, such as fishing and hunting. There are three elementary schools within the municipality.

Communities
The communities in the township are Holtyre, Matheson, Ramore, Shillington, Val Gagné and Wavell. The main community of Matheson is located at the intersection of highways 11 and 101.

History
Prospecting started in 1909.  The Croesus Mine (1914-1918) became "one of the richest mines in Canada," according to Barnes.  Gold was like "plums in pudding" and "one gold nugget was egg shaped, two inches long and one and a quarter across."  A total of 16 companies operated in the Harker Holloway area from 1917 to 1925, including Harker Gold Mines.  P.A. McDermott found a gold-bearing zone in 1922, which became American Barrick's Holt-McDermott Mine in 1988.  Located in the Abitibi greenstone belt, the mine produced 60,000 ounces of gold in 1994.

The Great Fire of 1916 left 243 dead.

Demographics 

Population trend:
 Population in 2016: 2,438
 Population in 2011: 2,410
 Population in 2006: 2,619
 Population in 2001: 2,912 (or 2,886 when adjusted for 2006 boundaries)
 Population in 1996: 3,220
 Population in 1991: 3,451

Notable people
 Harry Brightwell, Member of Parliament; born in Matheson.
 Bob McCord, professional hockey player; born in Matheson.
 Dianne Poole, Member of Provincial Parliament; raised in Matheson.

See also
 Bolton Lake
 Canadian Forces Station Ramore
 Wahgoshig First Nation
 Timmins—James Bay Electoral District
 List of townships in Ontario
 List of communities in Ontario
 List of francophone communities in Ontario
Matachewan, Ontario
Cobalt silver rush
Porcupine Gold Rush
Red Lake, Ontario
Greenstone, Ontario

References

External links

Municipalities in Cochrane District
Single-tier municipalities in Ontario
Township municipalities in Ontario